Joseph Lawless was an American football coach.  He served as the third head football coach at Boston College, coaching one season in 1895 and compiling a record of 2–4–2.

Head coaching record

References

Year of birth missing
Year of death missing
Boston College Eagles football coaches